East Makira is a single-member constituency of the National Parliament of Solomon Islands. Located on the island of Makira, it was established in 1973 when the Governing Council was expanded from 17 to 24 seats.

List of MPs

Election results

December 2019

April 2019

2014

2010

2006

2001

1997

1993

1989

1984

1980

1976

1973

References

Governing Council of the Solomon Islands constituencies
Legislative Assembly of the Solomon Islands constituencies
Solomon Islands parliamentary constituencies
1973 establishments in the Solomon Islands
Constituencies established in 1973